Barpeta Assembly constituency is one of the 126 assembly constituencies of  Assam a Northeastern state of India.  Barpeta is also part of Barpeta Lok Sabha constituency.

Town Details

Country: India.
 State: Assam.
 District:  Barpeta district.
 Lok Sabha Constituency: Barpeta Lok Sabha/Parliamentary constituency.
 Assembly Categorisation: Semi Urban constituency.
 Literacy Level: 65.03%.
 Eligible Electors as per 2021 General Elections:2,07,536 Eligible Electors. Male Electors:1,05,256 . Female Electors: 1,02,275.
 Geographic Co-Ordinates:   26°26’47.4"N 91°00’25.2"E.
 Total Area Covered: 229 square kilometres.
 Area Includes: Barpeta, Ghilajari and Howli mouzas in Barpeta thana in Barpeta sub-division, of Barpeta district of Assam.
 Inter State Border : Barpeta.
 Number Of Polling Stations: Year 2011-206,Year 2016-213,Year 2021-43.

Member of Legislative Assembly

 1957: Mahadev Das, Indian National Congress.
 1957: Srihari Das, Praja Socialist Party.
 1962: Madhusudhan Das, Praja Socialist Party.
 1965: D.Talukdar, Indian National Congress.
 1967: S.N. Das, Praja Socialist Party.
 1972: Surendra Nath Da, Indian National Congress.
 1978: A. Latif, Independent.
 1983: Ismail Hussain, Independent.
 1985: Kumar Deepak Das, Independent.
 1991: Ismail Hussain, Indian National Congress.
 1996: Ismail Hussain, All India Indira Congress (Tiwari).
 2001: Ismail Hussain, Indian National Congress.
 2006: Gunindra Nath Das, Asom Gana Parishad.
 2011: Abdur Rahim Khan, All India United Democratic Front.
 2016: Gunindra Nath Das, Asom Gana Parishad.
 2021: Abdur Rahim Ahmed, Indian National Congress.

Election results

2016 results

2011 results

2006 results

See also

 Barpeta
 Barpeta district
 List of constituencies of Assam Legislative Assembly

References

External links 
 

Assembly constituencies of Assam
Barpeta district
Barpeta